is a Japanese actor best known for his role as Jadeite in Pretty Guardian Sailor Moon. Jun has also worked as a model. Nowadays he plays with the music group "As a Sign of human", as guitarist/vocalist.

Profile 
 Birth date: 
 Hometown: Tokyo, Japan
 Talent agency: Office Watanabe

Filmography 
 1998: "Young Gamu Takayama" from Ultraman Gaia
 1999: Busuka! Busuka!!
 2001: "Fujisaki Tatuya" from Heart
 2003-2004: "Jadeite" from Pretty Guardian Sailor Moon
 2004: Tokusou Sentai Dekaranger 45th story

External links 
 
 
 http://www.tsukiyama-sama.net/BSSMLA/Jadeite.htm

1986 births
Living people
People from Tokyo